51st Brigade or 51st Infantry Brigade may refer to:
 51st Guards Artillery Brigade (Belarus)
 51st Indian Brigade of the British Indian Army in the First World War
 51st Indian Infantry Brigade of the British Indian Army in the Second World War
 51st Mechanized Brigade (Ukraine)
 51st Infantry Brigade (United Kingdom)

See also

 51st Division (disambiguation)